The Fletcher Islands are a small group of islands lying  west-southwest (WSW) of Cape Gray in the eastern part of Commonwealth Bay. The Fletcher Islands were discovered by the Australian Antarctic Expedition (AAE) (1911-1914) under Douglas Mawson, who gave the name Fletcher to Fletcher Island, the large island of the group. The United States Advisory Committee on Antarctic Names (US-ACAN) recommends that the name Fletcher also be applied for the group in keeping with the interpretation shown on G.D. Blodgett's 1955 map compiled from air photos taken by U.S. Navy (USN) Operation Highjump (1946-1947).

See also
 Composite Antarctic Gazetteer
 Fletcher Island
 List of Antarctic and sub-Antarctic islands
 List of Antarctic islands south of 60° S
 SCAR
 Territorial claims in Antarctica

References

Islands of George V Land